Palain (also Romanized as Palā’īn) is a village in Khalazir Rural District, Aftab District, Tehran County, Tehran Province, Iran. At the 2006 census, its population was 361, in 81 families.

References 

Populated places in Tehran County